The President of the United Malays National Organisation or President of UMNO (Malay: Presiden Pertubuhan Kebangsaan Melayu Bersatu or Presiden UMNO) is the highest position of the largest and oldest party in Malaysia. Since 30 June 2018, the office has been held by Ahmad Zahid Hamidi. 

The President of the United Malays National Organisation is supported by a deputy president who, since 2018, has been Mohamad Hasan. Furthermore, the president is supported by three vice presidents, currently holding by Ismail Sabri Yaakob, Mahdzir Khalid, and  Mohamed Khaled Nordin.

Presidents of the United Malays National Organisation 
With the exceptions of Ahmad Zahid Hamidi and Onn Jaafar, every Presidents of UMNO served as the Prime Minister of Malaysia from August 1957 to May 2018 and a Vice President of UMNO (Ismail Sabri Yaakob) served as the Prime Minister from August 2021 to November 2022.

See also 
 Barisan Nasional
 Muafakat Nasional
 United Malays National Organisation leadership elections
 1988 Malaysian constitutional crisis
 2020–22 Malaysian political crisis

References

External links 

 

United Malays National Organisation
United Malays National Organisation politicians
United Malays National Organisation